Feel was a New York City-based studio urban-oriented dance-pop band, active between 1982 and 1983. Originally consisted of Players Association arrangers and music producers Chris Hills and Danny Weiss, while vocals were provided by Gail Freeman. Freeman later released two singles titled "Mr. Right" (in 1985) and "Danger in the Airwaves" (in 1989). Freeman also played clavinet on Aurra's album Live and Let Live.

Feel's first record was "I'd Like To", released by Sutra Records in the United States and by Buddah Records in United Kingdom. The single reached number 53 on the Billboard Top Dance Singles chart and also was chosen into Top Single Picks, a list of recommended recordings published by Billboard. "I'd Like To" was then followed by "Let's Rock (Over & Over Again)", which was released in the same year by the same label and managed to reach #58 on the R&B Singles chart. Their next record "Got to Have Your Lovin'" released in 1983 was a change to electro-pop sound, yet without receiving any commercial success.

Chart performance

Discography

Singles
"I'd Like To"

"Let's Rock"

"Got To Have Your Lovin'"

References

External links
 
 Gail Freeman discography at Discogs.

Musical groups from New York City
Musical groups established in 1982
Musical groups disestablished in 1983
American women pop singers
American boogie musicians
American freestyle music groups
American garage house musicians
American dance music groups
Buddah Records artists
Mirage Records artists
1982 establishments in New York City